Qutbi Brothers are an Indian Qawwali group, headed by Haji Mohammad Idris and Arshad Qutbi (born in Delhi) are better known as the Qutbi Brothers. They are considered as the most popular qawwali group of India.

History 
Qutbi Brothers are the Inheritors of a 750 year old tradition nurtured and developed over several generations in India. They belong to the dargah of Qutbuddin Bakhtiyar Kaki in Delhi, where they began calling themselves the "Qutbi Brothers".

Career 
Qutbi Brothers started their singing at a very early age, and today they are one of the most popular  qawwali groups in India.
Qutbi Brothers are world's first qawwal who have created a World Record for a non-stop 12-hour singing (live), supported by the Sangeet Natak Akademi to promote the culture. In their career, Qutbi Brothers (Haji Mohammad Idris & Arshad Hussain) have toured outside of India and sang at music festivals. Their names are  included in the Limca Book of Record for their  contribution to sufi music in the 2019 edition.
The Qutbi Brothers Qawwals have earned the Top Grade level of artistry as recognized by All India Radio for their traditional sufiyana style.  Qutubi Brothers (Haji Mohamamad Idris and Arshad Hussain ) are an Outstanding empaneled artist of ICCR and the Ministry of Culture.

Filmography 
 2015: Mere Maula (Room: The: Myster) (Bollywood movie)
 2021: Piya Bin (Zee Music Company)  
 2002: Khwaja Ne Nawaza (T-Series)

Social Work 
Along with live performing, Qutbi Brothers are associated with various social works. They perform live concerts for various social causes to raise funds. In 2018 they performed for a fundraiser event for the unprivileged children organized by Salaam Baalak Trust.

Awards and recognition 
For their work and contribution to qawwali music, Idris Qutbi (Qutbi Brothers) have received several prestigious awards such as, Genius Indian Achiever’s Award, Special Prize from Parliament House (India), Atal Bihari Award 2019, Rajiv Gandhi Award among others.

References 
Keepers of Tradition Qutbi Brothers Qawwals The Pioneer (India) on 06, October 2018

Renowned Qawwals Qutbi Brothers (Haji Mohammad Idris & Mohammad Ilyas)  Hindustan Times on 4 May 2016

Qawwals-weave-magic The Tribune on 1 Oct 2019

A walk through India's history and culture CNBC TV18 on 16 February 2020

Jashn-e-Qawwali: a celebration of timeless renditions The Hindu Published on FEBRUARY 13, 2018

External links 
Official Website

Indian qawwali singers
Performers of Sufi music
Indian folk singers
Indian musical groups
21st-century Indian singers
Indian qawwali groups
Bollywood playback singers
Qawwali
Indian folk music groups
Living people
Urdu playback singers
Year of birth missing (living people)